The 1981 ECAC South men's basketball tournament (now known as the Colonial Athletic Association men's basketball tournament) was held March 5–7 at the Hampton Coliseum in Hampton, Virginia. 

James Madison defeated  in the championship game, 69–60, to win their first ECAC South men's basketball tournament. The Dukes, therefore, earned an automatic bid to the 1981 NCAA tournament; this was JMU's first-ever bid to the NCAA tournament.

Bracket

References

Colonial Athletic Association men's basketball tournament
Tournament
ECAC South men's basketball tournament
ECAC South men's basketball tournament
College basketball tournaments in Virginia
Sports in Hampton, Virginia